Summer in Berlin is a 2005 German tragicomic film directed by Andreas Dresen.

Reception
The film won the Bayerischer Filmpreis (Bavarian Film Award) for Dresen as "Best Director", the Silver Hugo Award for Inka Friedrich and Nadja Uhl together as "Best Actress", and sold nearly one million tickets at the box office, making it the ninth most popular German language film of 2006.

References

Further reading

External links 
 Official website in English and German
 

2005 films
2005 comedy-drama films
2000s German-language films
German comedy-drama films
Films directed by Andreas Dresen
Films set in Berlin
2000s German films